Sultan Ahmad Khan bin Sardar 'Azim Mohammadzai, also known as Sultan Jan was the ruler of the Principality of Herat from September 1857 to April 1863. He was a nephew of Dost Mohammad Khan. In 1855-56, Sultan Ahmad Khan sent a petition to the Shahanshah. If they would support Sultan Ahmad Khan with an army he would overthrow the Amir-i Kabir and annex Afghanistan into the Guarded Domains. He was intercepted by Dost Mohammad Khan though and exiled Sultan Ahmad Khan to Iran. When the Anglo-Persian War ended he was installed as ruler of Herat by the Iranians. On May 24, 1857, he arrived in Herat. The Iranians evacuated Herat in September 1857 in accordance with the Treaty of Paris. During his reign, he was completely dependent on Iran and not only minted coins in the Shahanshah's name, but also repeatedly given support upon request against the Mohammadzais. Naser al-Din Shah bestowed the title of Sirkar on Sultan Ahmad Khan and bestowed the title of Amir Panji on Sultan Ahmad Khan's son, Shah Nawaz Khan.

Khan captured Farah soon after in March 1862, which was controlled by the Barakzai Emirs since 30th October 1856. This became Dost Mohammad Khan's casus belli to launch an attack on Herat. On June 29 or July 8 Farah was captured by the Muhammadzais. On July 22, Sabzawar was captured. By July 28, Herat was besieged.  During the 10-month siege Ahmad died on March 6, 1863, being succeeded by his son Shah Nawaz Khan. Shortly before his death, he had been affected by a disease that causes limb paralysis.  On May 27, 1863, Herat would finally fall to the Amir.

See also 

 Principality of Herat
Herat Campaign of 1862-1863
 Anglo-Persian War
 Dost Mohammad Khan
 1st Anglo-Afghan War
 Sher Ali Khan

References

19th-century Afghan monarchs
History of Herat Province
1857 deaths
Year of birth missing